Geneviève Gobillot is a French scholar of Islam, Muslim civilization professor at the Jean Moulin University Lyon 3 since 1993, a specialist in Islamic mysticism, Shi'ism and Sufism, particularly in Al-Hakim al-Tirmidhi, author of the 10th century. Her work also includes the intercultural and intertextual reading of the Qur'an in the context of a rapprochement between monotheisms.

Publications 
 Books
1998: Les Chiites, Brépols
2000: La Conception originelle : Ses interprétations et fonctions chez les penseurs musulmans, Institut Français d'Archéologie Orientale
2005: L’Orient chrétien dans l’Empire musulman (Hommage à Gérard Troupeau), collective work under the direction of  &  Geneviève Gobillot, coll. "Studia Arabica" Vol. III, Éditions de Paris
2007: Pluralisme religieux : quelle âme pour l'Europe ? (with Heinz-Otto Luthe and Marie-Thérèse Urvoy), coll. "Studia Arabica", Éditions de Paris
2007: Exégèse et critique des textes sacrés : judaïsme, christianisme, islam hier et aujourd'hui (with Danielle Delmaire, Yohanan Lambert and Bernard Barc), Librairie orientaliste Paul Geuthner
2007: Le Coran (with ), Paris, éd. du Cavalier bleu, coll. "Idées reçues"
2011: Islam et Coran : Idées reçues sur l'histoire, les textes et les pratiques d'un milliard et demi de musulmans (with Paul Balta and Michel Cuypers), éd. du Cavalier bleu
2014: Idées reçues sur le Coran : entre tradition islamique et lecture moderne  (with Michel Cuypers), éd. du Cavalier bleu

Contributions, prefaces and articles
2002: Introduction and presentation of Les Calendriers et leurs implications culturelles, ELAH
2009: La Bible vue par le Coran, in Chrétiens face à l’islam. Premiers temps, premières controverses, Bayard, 2009,  (p. 139–169)
2011: Édition et préface de Monde de l’Islam et Occident. Les voies de l’interculturalité, éd. E. M. E., coll. "Transversales philosophiques"
 La Bible relue par le Coran, 19 December 2007, article by Geneviève Gobillot in L'Express

 Translations
1998: Al-Hakim al-Tirmidhi, Le Livre de la profondeur des choses, 306 p., Presses universitaires du Septentrion, coll. "Racines et modèles"
2006: Al-Hakim al-Tirmidhi, Le Livre des nuances, Ou de l'impossibilité de la synonymie, 570 p., Librairie orientaliste Paul Geuthner

References

External links 
 GOBILLOT Geneviève 
 Publications on Cairn
 Geneviève Gobillot, La fitra. La conception originelle, ses interprétations et fonctions chez les penseurs musulmans on Revue de l'histoire des religions
 Geneviève Gobillot on Canal Académie
 Geneviève Gobillot on the site of France Culture
 Une conférence de Geneviève Gobillot on the site 

French Islamic studies scholars
French Arabists
Arabic–French translators
Living people
Year of birth missing (living people)